Alexander Livingston may refer to:

Alexander Livingston, 5th Lord Livingston (died 1550)
Alexander Livingston, 1st Earl of Linlithgow (died 1623)
Alexander Livingston, 2nd Earl of Linlithgow (died 1650)
Alexander Livingston of Callendar (died 1451)

See also
Alexander Livingstone (disambiguation)